Stachys clingmanii, or Clingman's hedgenettle, is a North American species of plant in the mint family. It is found at higher elevations in the Great Smoky Mountains of Tennessee and the Carolinas, with additional populations in Illinois, Indiana, and Vermont. It is a threatened species in Tennessee.

Stachys clingmanii is an erect branching herb up to 90 cm (3 feet) tall. It blooms in summer, producing flowers up to 1.5 cm (0.6 inches) long.

References

External links
photo of herbarium specimen at Missouri Botanical Garden, collected in North Carolina in 1891

clingmanii
Endemic flora of the United States
Flora of the Eastern United States
Endangered flora of the United States
Plants described in 1903
Taxa named by John Kunkel Small